HD 18970 is a class G9.5III (yellow giant) star in the constellation Perseus. Its apparent magnitude is 4.77 and it is approximately 211 light years away based on parallax.

References

Perseus (constellation)
G-type giants
Persei, k
BD+56 767
014382
0918
018970